Mramorje or Bagruša is a medieval necropolis, located in Perućac, Serbia, and is among the best preserved necropoli of the region. The necropolis was built in the 14th century, and extends between the Drina river and the main road that follows its course, at the entrance of the settlement. The site is protected by the Republic of Serbia, as a Monument of Culture of Exceptional Importance, but is nevertheless threatened by the Drina river on one side and the continued expanding of the town of Perućac, on the other. Stećaks was inscribed as a UNESCO World Heritage Site in 2016, of which 3 sites are located in Serbia, Mramorje being one of them.

The Necropolis
The Necropolis, with about 200 tombstones made of solid limestone, was established in the fourteenth century. Earlier sources record a number of 122 monuments, while according to recent data, there are 93 as follows: 46 panel, 18  with stand, 10 slemenjak without stand, 7 sarcophagus with stand, 10 sarcophagus without base, and 2 amorphous samples. Over time, some of the tombstones were moved, others have sunken into the ground, while several items were transferred to museums (two tombstones with no decorations are in the collection of the Ethnographic Museum in Belgrade, and one is in the National Museum in Užice).

Tombstones in the necropolis are arranged in regular rows, and also tend to have an east–west orientation. No inscriptions can be read on the tombstones, however a number of them are fine-processed, very few of them are decorated, and there are a few recorded motifs (including circles, the moon, and sword and shield designs).

See also

 Stećak
 Perućac Lake
 Monuments of Culture of Exceptional Importance

References

Buildings and structures completed in the 14th century
Medieval sites in Serbia
Bajina Bašta
Archaeological Sites of Exceptional Importance
Medieval Serbian architecture
Cemeteries in Serbia
World Heritage Sites in Serbia